The following radio stations broadcast on FM frequency 90.8 MHz:

China 
 CNR Business Radio in Meizhou

Japan
Radio Fukushima in Fukushima
Radio Fukushima in Koriyama, Fukushima
RKC Radio in Kochi

Malaysia
 TraXX FM in Jeli, Kelantan

Turkey
Super FM in Ankara, Istanbul, Izmir and Bursa
 Radyo 3 in Karaman

References

Lists of radio stations by frequency